Amri or Amri Karbi also known as Dumra language is spoken by the plain Karbi people of Assam and hilly Meghalaya. Latin script is used for institutional practice, though authors use both Latin and Assamese script in various publications. The speakers consider their speech as a variety of the Karbi language.

Locations
Amri (Karbi) language is spoken in the following locations in India (Ethnologue).

Kamrup district, Assam (south of the Brahmaputra River): Chandubi, Loharghat, Rani block, Jalukbari, Pandu, Basbistha, Panikhaith, Jorabat, Sonapur, Khetri, and Kahi Kusi
Ri-Bhoi district, Meghalaya: Nongpoh area, Barni Hat, and Umling

See also
Karbi language

References

Kuki-Chin–Naga languages
Languages of Assam
Languages of Meghalaya